Epaspidoceras is an extinct ammonoid cephalopod genus belonging to the order Ammonitida, family Aspidoceratidae. These cephalopods were fast-moving nektonic carnivores. They lived during the Jurassic (Kimmeridgian).

References
Notes

Web Links
 Organism names
 C. Sarti Il kimmeridgiano delle prealpi veneto-trentine: fauna e biostratigrafia

Jurassic ammonites
Kimmeridgian life
Ammonitida genera
Aspidoceratidae